Alexei Yurchak is a professor of anthropology at the University of California, Berkeley. Born and raised in Leningrad, the Soviet Union, his research concerns Soviet history and post-Soviet transformations in Russia and the former Soviet Union.

"Hypernormalization"
Yurchak coined the term "hypernormalization" in his 2005 book Everything was Forever, Until it was No More: The Last Soviet Generation. The book focused on the political, social and cultural conditions during what he terms "late socialism" (the period after Stalin but before Perestroika, mid-1950s – mid-1980s) which led to the ultimate collapse of the Soviet state in 1991. 

In 2007 Everything was Forever won the Wayne Vucinic award (best book of the year) from the American Association for Slavic, East European, and Eurasian Studies.

Yurchak rewrote the book in Russian, expanding and revising it considerably. It was published in 2014 by NLO (Moscow) and in 2015 won the Prosvetitel (Enlightener) Award for Russia's best non-fiction book of the year.

Books
 Это было навсегда, пока не кончилось. Последнее советское поколение, Новое литературное обозрение, 2014
 Everything was Forever, Until it was No More: The Last Soviet Generation, Princeton University Press, 2006

References

External links 
Alexei Yurchak Google Scholar

Russian academics
21st-century Russian historians
University of California, Berkeley faculty
Living people
1960 births